Azra Hadzic (born 26 November 1994) is a retired Australian tennis player of Bosnian descent.

Hadzic won one singles title on the ITF tour in her career. On 1 April 2013, she reached her best singles ranking of world number 301. On 27 January 2014, she peaked at world number 512 in the doubles rankings.

Hadzic started playing on the ITF circuit in 2009 and made her WTA debut playing in the qualifying tournament of the 2012 Apia International Sydney. She made her Grand Slam debut in 2013 with a wildcard into the qualifying draw of the Australian Open and later that year won her maiden ITF title in Cairns. She was awarded a wildcard to the main doubles draw at the 2014 Australian Open.

Career

2009 
In 2009, Hadzic made her debut on the ITF Women's Circuit, playing a handful of events in Bosnia and Australia.

2010 
In September 2010, Hadzic had a breakthrough tournament at the $25,000 ITF event in Cairns. She reached the quarterfinals after having to qualify and en route defeated the second seed Yurika Sema in straight sets. This result gave her a WTA ranking for the first time.

2011 
In 2011, Hadzic continued playing ITF events and repeated her quarterfinal finish at the Cairns Tennis International. In December, she reached the semifinals of the Optus Australian 18s Championships, losing to eventual champion Ashleigh Barty.

2012 
In January, Hadzic made her WTA debut with a wildcard into qualifying for the 2012 Apia International Sydney, losing to Chanelle Scheepers in straight sets. In February, she had a career-best win, defeating the world's number one ranked junior Irina Khromacheva in qualifying for a $25,000 ITF tournament in Launceston. Later in the year, she reached the quarterfinals of the $25,000 events in Rockhampton and Esperance, losing on both occasions to Olivia Rogowska. In December, she reached the final of the 2012 Optus Australian 18s Championships.

2013 
Hadzic again received a wildcard into the qualifying tournament of the Sydney International, losing to Coco Vandeweghe in straight sets. She then made her senior Grand Slam debut with a wildcard into Australian Open qualifying, where she lost to Michelle Larcher de Brito. In February, she reached her first ITF final in Mildura, losing to the Russian Ksenia Lykina. She made the semifinals of ITF tournaments in Sydney (twice) and Toowoomba before reaching her second career ITF final at the $15,000 tournament in Cairns where she claimed her maiden senior title, defeating Jessica Moore in three sets.

2014 
Hadzic started 2014 with a wildcard for Hobart qualifying, but lost to Andrea Hlaváčková.

Partnering Jessica Moore, she was awarded a wildcard into the main draw of 2014 Australian Open – Women's doubles, where they faced the 11th seeded team of Anna-Lena Grönefeld and Mirjana Lučić-Baroni, both former Grand Slam champions, losing in straight sets.

In February, Hadzic knocked out top seed and world number 116 Magda Linette in the first round of the Launceston Tennis International. Following a second round win over Priscilla Hon, Hadzic lost in the quarterfinals to Eri Hozumi.

Hadzic announced her retirement from tennis in March 2014.

ITF finals (1–1)

Singles (1–1)

References

External links 

 
 
 

1994 births
Living people
Sportswomen from Victoria (Australia)
Australian female tennis players
Australian people of Bosnia and Herzegovina descent
Tennis players from Melbourne
Australian people of Bosniak descent
People from Box Hill, Victoria